The Großer Müllroser See is a lake in Brandenburg, Germany. It is located in the district Oder-Spree between the town Müllrose in the north and the municipality Mixdorf in the south. The lake covers an area of 1,32 km². At an elevation of 41,6 m, its depth is maximal 8 m.

The lake is the largest water in the Schlaube Valley Nature Park and flown through by the river Schlaube, which runs over a distance of 20 kilometers through the Schlaube-Valley (German: Schlaubetal), a tunnel valley of the last glacial period. An approximately 9 kilometres long walking path leads around the lake. At the eastern and western shore there are public lidos/beaches, one of them with a diving tower. On the sea are operating some passenger ships. The watermill Müllrose at the northern shore was first mentioned in a document in 1275 and is still in use today.

References

External links

Lakes of Brandenburg
Oder-Spree